Princess Kasuga no Ōiratsume (? – fl. 499) was Empress of Japan as the consort of Emperor Ninken.

Daughter of Emperor Yuryaku.

Issue

, married to Emperor Keitai

, married to Emperor Senka
, later Emperor Buretsu

Notes

Japanese empresses
Year of death missing
5th-century Japanese women
Japanese princesses